Fernando Antonio Pisani  (born December 27, 1976) is a Canadian former professional ice hockey right winger. He played professionally in the National Hockey League for his hometown Edmonton Oilers for seven NHL seasons, and one for the Chicago Blackhawks.

Playing career
After posting 103 points in 58 games with the St. Albert Saints of the Alberta Junior Hockey League (AJHL), Pisani was drafted in the eighth round, 195th overall, by his hometown team, the Edmonton Oilers in the 1996 NHL Entry Draft. Upon being drafted, Pisani played four years of collegiate hockey for Providence College.

In 2000–01, the Oilers assigned him to their American Hockey League (AHL) affiliate, the Hamilton Bulldogs. Pisani spent two seasons in Hamilton, before being called up in his third AHL season in 2002–03. He scored his first NHL goal on February 5, 2003, in a 2-1 win against the Mighty Ducks of Anaheim.  He finished the season with the Oilers, playing in 35 games with 13 points.  Pisani is generally considered a "late bloomer", because he did not see his first NHL action until the age of 27.

Due to the 2004–05 NHL lockout, Pisani went overseas to Europe and played in the Swiss Nationalliga A and Italian Serie A with HC Asiago.

2006 Stanley Cup Playoffs
As NHL play resumed in 2005–06, Pisani scored a career-high 18 goals, 19 assists and 37 points.  Although the Oilers entered the playoffs as the eighth and final seed in the Western Conference, they embarked on a cinderella run to the 2006 Stanley Cup Finals against the Carolina Hurricanes. Pisani became a playoff hero in the process, significantly elevating his game.  Against the first-seeded Detroit Red Wings, Pisani scored two third period goals (his fourth and fifth of the series) in game six, series-clinching 4-2 victory.  Advancing to the second round against the San Jose Sharks, Pisani recorded another two-goal effort, including the game winner, in a 6-3 game five win.  Reaching the finals against Carolina, the Oilers faced elimination in the fifth game.  Going into overtime on the penalty kill, Pisani intercepted a pass and scored his second goal of the game on a breakaway to stave off elimination.  It was the first time in Stanley Cup Finals history that an overtime game was decided by a shorthanded goal.  Pisani then scored the Oilers' only goal in a game seven loss.  He just missed tying the game with three minutes left in regulation time when his shot, on the rebound from the initial shot by Raffi Torres, were both saved by Carolina goalie Cam Ward.

Pisani finished the playoffs with a league-leading 14 goals including 5 game-winners, nearly matching his regular season output of 18 goals in 80 games.  He was re-signed by the Oilers in the off-season to a four-year, $10 million contract on July 1, 2006.

Ulcerative Colitis
Pisani followed his 2006 playoff performance with a 28-point season in 2006–07, but the Oilers failed to qualify for the post-season.  Prior to the start of the 2007–08 season, he was diagnosed with ulcerative colitis, sidelining him for the first 26 games of the campaign. He returned to the Oilers lineup on December 2, 2007, and was nominated that year for the Bill Masterton Trophy, an award given for perseverance and dedication to hockey.  The award was subsequently given to Jason Blake of the Toronto Maple Leafs who had been diagnosed with chronic myelogenous leukemia at the start of the season, but still managed to play in all 82 games.

Final NHL years
An injury shortened 2008–09 NHL season saw Pisani suit up for only 38 games, scoring seven goals to go with eight assists.

After becoming an unrestricted free agent, Pisani signed a one-year deal with the reigning Stanley Cup champions, the Chicago Blackhawks, for the 2010–11 season, during which he appeared in 60 games and registered 16 points.

On January 1, 2012, the Swedish team Södertälje SK of the HockeyAllsvenskan announced that Pisani would join the team. However, on January 10, Pisani revoked the contract, stating that he did not think he was at a level where he could contribute effectively.

Personal life
He attended St. Cecilia Junior High School and Archbishop O'Leary Catholic High School with Sheldon Souray. He and his wife Heidi have two sons and a daughter.

Records
First player to score a shorthanded overtime goal in Stanley Cup Finals history - June 14, 2006

Career statistics
Bold indicates led league

See also
 List of people diagnosed with ulcerative colitis

References

External links

 

1976 births
Living people
Asiago Hockey 1935 players
Bonnyville Pontiacs players
Canadian expatriate ice hockey players in Italy
Canadian ice hockey right wingers
Canadian people of Italian descent
Chicago Blackhawks players
Edmonton Oilers draft picks
Edmonton Oilers players
Hamilton Bulldogs (AHL) players
Providence Friars men's ice hockey players
SCL Tigers players
Ice hockey people from Edmonton
St. Albert Saints players